The 2019 European Pairs Speedway Championship was the 16th edition of the European Pairs Speedway Championship. The final was held in Balakovo, Russia on 29 August. 

The title was won by Russia for the first time.

Final

See also 
 2019 Speedway European Championship

References 

2019
European Championship Pairs
Speedway European Championship